Haag am Hausruck is a municipality in the district of Grieskirchen in the Austrian state of Upper Austria. It is home to many great European buildings as well as its own Castle. Haag (for short) is located right next to a very large and scenic forest.

Geography
Haag lies in the Hausruckviertel. About 88 percent of the municipality is farmland, and 2 percent is urban.

References

Cities and towns in Grieskirchen District